Aelurillus mirabilis is a jumping spider species in the genus Aelurillus that lives in Namibia. It was first identified by Wanda Wesołowska in 2006.

References

Endemic fauna of Namibia
Salticidae
Fauna of Namibia
Spiders of Africa
Spiders described in 2006
Taxa named by Wanda Wesołowska